Hernán Barcos (born 11 April 1984) is an Argentine professional footballer who plays as a forward for Alianza Lima. He is nicknamed El Pirata (The Pirate) and is well known for his finishing ability, technique and strength.

Club career

Early career
Barcos debuted professionally for Racing in August 2004. He then went on to play on loan for Club Guaraní (Paraguay), Olmedo (Ecuador), Red Star Belgrade (Serbia), and Huracán (Argentina).

On 7 October 2007, Barcos scored his first Serbian SuperLiga goals by netting twice in the late minutes versus Banat Zrenjanin, helping Red Star to get three points. He previously scored once in a Serbian Cup game against Teleoptik.

Chinese Super League
In February 2009, Barcos signed a year long loan with Chinese Super League side Shanghai Shenhua. However, after a disappointing half season at Shanghai, he was loaned out to Shenzhen Asia Travel, a fellow CSL club. He scored the first hat-trick in his career in Shenzhen's 4–0 victory over Changchun Yatai on 16 September 2009. He scored 14 goals in 14 league games with Shenzhen and won Chinese Football Association Golden Boot award in the end of the season.

LDU Quito
In early 2010, Barcos transferred to LDU Quito to reinforce the squad after their leading goalscorer transferred out. He established himself as a capable striker for the squad, starting a five-game run where he scored one goal a game. Barcos, or "El Pirata" as he was nicknamed by the Liga fans, scored two vital goals against Estudiantes de La Plata in LDU's 2–1 first-leg win, winning the 2010 Recopa Sudamericana. Barcos' ended his illustrious 2010 season as Ecuadorian Serie A champion, having scored 22 league goals in 32 games, second best in the league, behind Jaime Ayoví who scored 23 goals.

In the 2011 Ecuadorian Serie A season, Barcos scored 25 goals in 51 matches in all competitions. On 13 August 2011, Barcos did what no other LDU Quito player had ever accomplished in any competition, he scored five goals in a single game against Manta. Barcos would continue with his scoring ability, netting in seven goals in the 2011 Copa Sudamericana. He scored an important away goal for LDU Quito in the team's first win ever in Buenos Aires in a 1–0 win against Vélez Sarsfield, thus reaching the Copa Sudamericana finals. He failed to score a single goal in the finals against Universidad de Chile, and though only ended up as runner up in the competition, he and the rest of LDU Quito received support and appraisal from the club's fans. After two amazing years with the club, he had many offers from wealthy clubs. In January 2012, LDU Quito was offered $8 million from a Middle Eastern club to sign Barcos, while simultaneously also offered only $3.5 million from Palmeiras. Even though LDU Quito was suffering from debt, they honored Barcos' wishes to play for Palmeiras, and on 17 January 2012, he signed for the Brazilian team.

Palmeiras
On 17 January 2012, Barcos joined Brazilian Série A club Palmeiras for an undisclosed fee. He scored his first goal for the club on 11 February 2012, in a 3–0 victory against Ituano, in a Paulistão match. Barcos promised to achieve a total amount of 27 goals in his first season with Palmeiras, thus showing a countdown of how many are left to go on his football shoes. On 27 February 2012, football specialist Lédio Carmona compared Barcos to lobster, playing with coach Luiz Felipe Scolari who had said he wanted shrimp, meaning the quality of Palmeiras' signings for the new season. Barcos helped Palmeiras reach the 2012 Copa do Brasil finals by scoring four goals in eight cup games.

On 1 August 2012, Barcos scored a double in Palmeiras' debut in the Copa Sudamericana against Botafogo. He scored another double against Botafogo again, this time in a league match a week later, winning 2–1. Despite Palmeiras' relegation and interest of European clubs, Barcos via Twitter confirmed he would continue to play for club in 2013. In his words: "I have the dream to play a World Cup, but the only way to leave Palmeiras is receiving a irrecusable deal, that the club cannot say 'no'. I will stay in Palmeiras for love and for liking Palmeiras".

Palmeiras confirmed Barcos would stay for the 2013 season, having been relegated to Serie B, though he was able to participate in the 2013 Copa Libertadores. For Barcos, the fans of Palmeiras and Gilson Kleina's permanency on club were fundamental points to stay on the Verdão.

Grêmio
Barcos became Gremio's shock-signing for the 2013 season, wanting to arm a strong side for the 2013 Copa Libertadores. His debut came on 14 February, also scoring from the penalty spot, in a 2–1 home loss in a group-stage match up against Chilean Primera División side Huachipato. In August 2014, he scored twice in a match against Corinthians, becoming the top foreign goalscorer for Grêmio with 36 goals.

Later career
On 16 February 2015, Barcos transferred to Chinese Super League side Tianjin Teda. After a prolific goalscoring season, he transferred to Portuguese side Sporting CP. However, after a brief spell in Europe, the centre-forward returned to the Argentine Primera División, joining Vélez Sarsfield. Barcos debuted for Vélez in a 2–0 defeat to Gimnasia y Esgrima La Plata for the first fixture of the 2016–17 Argentine Primera División and scored his first goal in a 2–1 victory against Colón for the 6th fixture.

Return to LDU Quito
On 14 January 2017, LDU Quito announced the return of Barcos to the Ecuadorean capital. He was to be incorporated to the team to complete the new squad for the 2017 campaign in time for La Noche Blanca, the derby game against Deportivo Cali. The loan deal will last until the end of 2017.

Bashundhara Kings
On 2 February 2020, Bangladesh Premier League defending champions Bashundhara Kings confirmed that Barcos will be part of the team for AFC Cup and the 2nd leg of the league.

FC Messina
On 30 October 2020, Barcos was formally introduced as a new signing for Italian Serie D club FC Messina. He however left Messina on 23 December 2020, without making a single appearance, due to unsolved bureaucratic issues regarding his non-EU citizen status.

International career
On 23 August 2012, Barcos was called up for the matches against Paraguay and Peru for the 2014 FIFA World Cup qualification but he ended up being an unused substitute in them. Instead, he made his national team debut on 19 September 2012, as a starter in a match against Brazil for the Superclásico de las Américas. In October 2012, Barcos also came on as a late substitute in World Cup qualifying matches against Uruguay and Chile.

Personal life
On 16 February 2012, after a comparison with Brazilian singer Zé Ramalho made by Léo Bianchi, journalist of Rede Globo, Barcos cursed the reporter, calling him "boludo", a popular scold in Argentina.

Career statistics

Honours
LDU Quito
 Ecuadorian Serie A: 2010, 2018
 Recopa Sudamericana: 2010

Palmeiras
 Copa do Brasil: 2012

Cruzeiro
 Copa do Brasil: 2018

Alianza Lima
 Liga 1: 2021, 2022

Individual
 Chinese Super League Golden Boot: 2009
 Ecuadorian Serie A top scorer: 2010
 Ecuadorian Serie A top scorer: 2017
 League 1 (Peru) Best player of the year: 2021, 2022

Notes

References

External links
 
 
 
 
 
 Hernán Barcos at the Ecuadorian Football Federation

1984 births
Living people
Sportspeople from Córdoba Province, Argentina
Association football forwards
Argentine footballers
Argentina international footballers
Racing Club de Avellaneda footballers
Club Guaraní players
C.D. Olmedo footballers
Red Star Belgrade footballers
Club Atlético Huracán footballers
Shanghai Shenhua F.C. players
Shenzhen F.C. players
L.D.U. Quito footballers
Sociedade Esportiva Palmeiras players
Grêmio Foot-Ball Porto Alegrense players
Tianjin Jinmen Tiger F.C. players
Sporting CP footballers
Club Atlético Vélez Sarsfield footballers
Cruzeiro Esporte Clube players
Atlético Nacional footballers
Argentine expatriate footballers
Argentine expatriate sportspeople in Brazil
Argentine expatriate sportspeople in China
Argentine expatriate sportspeople in Ecuador
Argentine expatriate sportspeople in Paraguay
Argentine expatriate sportspeople in Portugal
Argentine expatriate sportspeople in Serbia
Expatriate footballers in Brazil
Expatriate footballers in China
Expatriate footballers in Ecuador
Expatriate footballers in Paraguay
Expatriate footballers in Portugal
Expatriate footballers in Serbia
Expatriate footballers in Colombia
Argentine Primera División players
Paraguayan Primera División players
Ecuadorian Serie A players
Serbian SuperLiga players
Chinese Super League players
Campeonato Brasileiro Série A players
Primeira Liga players
Categoría Primera A players